was the 75th emperor of Japan, according to the traditional order of succession.

Sutoku's reign spanned the years from 1123 through 1142.

Genealogy
Before his ascension to the Chrysanthemum Throne, his personal name (his imina) was Akihito (顕仁). Sutoku was the eldest son of Emperor Toba. Some old texts say he was instead the son of Toba's grandfather, Emperor Shirakawa.

Chūgū: Fujiwara no Kiyoko (藤原 聖子) later Kōkamon'in (皇嘉門院), Fujiwara no Tadamichi’s daughter
 Hyounosuke-no-Tsubone (兵衛佐局), Minamoto no Masamune's adopted daughter
 First son: Imperial  (1140–1162).
 Mikawa-dono (三河), Minamoto no Morotsune's daughter
 Fifth Son: Kakue (覚恵; 1151-1184)
 Karasuma-no-Tsubone (烏丸局)

Events of Sutoku's life

 February 25, 1123 (Hōan 4, 28th day of the 1st month): In the 16th year of Emperor Toba's reign (鳥羽天皇二十五年), he abdicated; and the succession (‘‘senso’’) was received by his son, aged 3.
 Hōan 4, in the 2nd month (1123): Emperor Sutoku is said to have acceded to the throne (‘‘sokui’’).
 1124 (Tenji 1, 2nd month): Former-Emperor Shirakawa and former-Emperor Toba went in carriages to outside the city where they could all together enjoy contemplating the flowers. Taiken-mon'in (? – August 26, 1145) (formerly Fujiwara no Shōshi), who was Toba's empress and Sutoku's mother, joined the procession along with many other women of the court.  Their cortege was brilliant and colorful.  A great many men of the court in hunting clothes followed the ladies in this parade.  Fujiwara no Tadamichi then followed in a carriage, accompanied by bands of musicians and women who were to sing for the emperors.
 1124 (Tenji 1, 10th month): Shirakawa visited Mount Kōya.
 1125 (Tenji 2, 10th month): The emperor visited Iwashimizu Shrine and the Kamo Shrines; and afterwards, he also visited the shrines Hirano, Ōharano, Mutsunoo, Kitano, Gion and several others.
 1128 (Daiji 3, 3rd month): Taiken-mon'in ordered the construction of Enshō-ji in fulfillment of a sacred vow.  This was one in a series of "sacred vow temples" (gogan-ji) built by imperial command following a precedent established by Emperor Shirakawa's Hosshō-ji.
 1128 (Daiji 3, 6th month): Fujiwara no Tadamichi is relieved of his responsibilities and duties as sesshō (regent); and simultaneously, Tadamichi is named kampaku.
 August 17, 1135 (Hōen 1, 7th day of the 7th month): Former-Emperor Shirakawa died at the age of 77.
 1141 (Eiji  1, 3rd month): The former emperor Toba accepted the tonsure in becoming a monk at the age of 39.

In 1151, Sutoko ordered Waka imperial anthology Shika Wakashū.

In 1156, after failing to put down the Hōgen Rebellion, he was exiled to Sanuki Province (modern-day Kagawa prefecture on the island of Shikoku).
Emperor Sutoku's reign lasted for 19 years: 2 years in the nengō Tenji, 5 years in Daiji, 1 year in 'Tenshō, 3 years in Chōshō, 6 years in Hōen, and 1 year in Eiji.

The site of Sutoku's grave is settled.  This emperor is traditionally venerated at a memorial Shinto shrine (misasagi) in Sakaide, Kagawa. He was also enshrined (or sealed away ... ) in Shiramine shrine (ja), Kyoto and Kotohira-gū in Kagawa Prefecture. The former is also associated with the god of football, worshipped by Kuge clan Asukai in times of yore, while the latter enshrined Ō-mono-nushi-no-mikoto, a god known to have restored harmony in Yamato (or blackmailed Emperor Sujin ... ) in exchange for worship and nepotism.

The Imperial Household Agency designates this location as Sutoku's mausoleum.  It is formally named Shiramine no misasagi.

Kugyō
Kugyō (公卿) is a collective term for the very few most powerful men attached to the court of the Emperor of Japan in pre-Meiji eras.
 
In general, this elite group included only three to four men at a time.  These were hereditary courtiers whose experience and background would have brought them to the pinnacle of a life's career.  During Sutoku's reign, this apex of the Daijō-kan included: 
 Sesshō, Fujiwara no Tadamichi, 1097–1164.
 Daijō-daijin, Fujiwara no Tadamichi.
 Sadaijin
 Udaijin
 Nadaijin, Fujiwara no Yorinaga, 1120–1156.
 Dainagon

Eras of Sutoku's reign
The years of Sutoku's reign are more specifically identified by more than one era name or nengō.
 Hōan (1120–1124)
 Tenji (1124–1126)
 Daiji (1126–1131)
 Tenshō (1131–1132)
 Chōshō (1132–1135)
 Hōen (1135–1141)
 Eiji (1141–1142)

Legends

After Sutoku's abdication and exile, he devoted himself to monastic life. He copied numerous scriptures and offered them to the court. Fearing that the scriptures were cursed, the court refused to accept them. Everything from the subsequent fall in fortune of the Imperial court, the rise of the samurai powers, droughts and internal unrests were blamed on his haunting.

Along with Sugawara no Michizane and Taira no Masakado, he is often called one of the “.”.

Ancestry

See also
 Shin Heike Monogatari, (Taiga Drama), Masakazu Tamura played Emperor Sutoku.
 Emperor of Japan
 List of Emperors of Japan
 Imperial cult
 Goryō

Notes

References
 Brown, Delmer M. and Ichirō Ishida, eds. (1979).  Gukanshō: The Future and the Past. Berkeley: University of California Press. ;  OCLC 251325323
 Ponsonby-Fane, Richard Arthur Brabazon. (1959).  The Imperial House of Japan. Kyoto: Ponsonby Memorial Society. OCLC 194887
 _. (1963).  Vicissitudes of Shinto. Kyoto: Ponsonby Memorial Society. OCLC 36655
 Titsingh, Isaac. (1834). Nihon Odai Ichiran; ou,  Annales des empereurs du Japon.  Paris: Royal Asiatic Society, Oriental Translation Fund of Great Britain and Ireland.  OCLC 5850691
 Varley, H. Paul. (1980).  Jinnō Shōtōki: A Chronicle of Gods and Sovereigns. New York: Columbia University Press. ;  OCLC 59145842

 
 

 
Japanese emperors
1119 births
1164 deaths
12th-century Japanese monarchs
People of Heian-period Japan
Hyakunin Isshu poets
Deified Japanese people
Shikashū